Universalis is a role-playing game (RPG) from Ramshead Publishing that stresses interactive storytelling.  The game uses a unique system, based on "coins" that are used to make additions to the game, which allows the entire group to participate in the creation of the setting and events in play without a traditional gamemaster.  The rules also provide a means of negotiating their own alteration, allowing for unlimited customization for play. The system is meant to support any possible genre.

System

Story power
"Coins" are the measure of story power in Universalis. By spending coins, players can create "facts" in the game. These may be about characters, the setting, or the scene being played. Each player begins with a number of coins (typically 25), and gains more after each scene plays out (typically 5). Players may also gain coins by winning "complications" (see below).

Setting tenets
Unlike most RPGs, where the game setting and any setting-specific rules are either taken from a published source or created by the gamemaster, Universalis play begins with the setting of "tenets" which define the nature of the setting.

Going in a circle around the table, each player has the option to spend a coin to establish a tenet, or to pass. Tenets can be challenged using the rules, but it is more common for players to simply negotiate an amicable settlement when there is a disagreement about a proposed tenet. Once no more players want to establish new tenets, the initial phase is over and the game begins.

Scenes
Universalis is played out in scenes. Players bid coins for the privilege of establishing a new scene—the high bidder wins, and sets the location and time, and introduce characters or items into the scene. Play then proceeds around the table, with each player having the chance to narrate and spend coins. Spending coins establishes new facts in the game, which can be drawn on by the other players, and used in resolving complications. A player may interrupt the normal flow by spending a coin to do so, immediately having their turn.

Challenges
When a player wishes to establish a fact and another wants to oppose it, a challenge results if the two players cannot come to an agreement. Established facts can be drawn on in the challenge, and all players have the chance to weigh in with their coins. When everyone has spent the coins and called on the facts that they wish to, a die roll is then used to resolve the challenge (with the dice rolled depending on how many facts and coins each side has). The winner gains new coins, and narrates the result of the challenge.

Modifying the rules
Rules in Universalis are just another kind of fact, and can be established by spending coins.

External links 
 J B Bell, A review of Universalis at RPGnet, 8 October 2002

Indie role-playing games
Universal role-playing games
Collaborative fiction
Role-playing games introduced in 2002